Capparis zeylanica is a climbing shrub common in the forests of the Indian subcontinent, Indo-China, China and Malesia; no subspecies are listed in the Catalogue of Life. Several species of Lepidopteran larvae feed on its leaves.

Gallery

References

External links 
 Illustrations - Flickr
 Medicinal properties
 On medicinal properties

zeylanica
Flora of Indo-China
Flora of Malesia
Taxa named by Carl Linnaeus